Procopius or Prokopios is a given name which may refer to:

Ordered chronologically
 Procopius of Scythopolis (died 303), Christian martyr and saint
 Procopius (usurper) (326–366), Roman usurper
 Procopius (magister militum), Roman general, descendant of the usurper and father of the Emperor Anthemius
 Procopius Anthemius, Western Roman emperor 467–472
 Procopius of Gaza (c. 465–528), Christian rhetorician
 Procopius Anthemius (emperor's son), Eastern Roman Empire consul, son of Emperor Procopius Anthemius
 Procopius of Caesarea (c. 500–c. 565), Byzantine historian
 Procopius of Sázava (died 1053), Bohemian canon, hermit and Catholic saint
 Procopius of Ustyug (1243?—1303), fool for Christ (yurodivy), miracle worker and Russian Orthodox Church saint
 Prokop the Great (c. 1380–1434), Czech Hussite general, also known as Procopius the Great or Andrew Procopius
 Procopius I of Jerusalem (died 1788), Greek Orthodox Patriarch of Jerusalem
 Procopius of Constantinople (1734–1803 or 1804), Ecumenical Patriarch of Constantinople
 Procopius II of Jerusalem (died 1880), Greek Orthodox Patriarch of Jerusalem
 Prokopios Lazaridis (1859–1923), Greek Orthodox metropolitan bishop and saint
 Prokopios Pavlopoulos (born 1950), Greek lawyer and politician, President of Greece from 2015 to 2020

See also 
 Saint Procopius (disambiguation)
 Procopio (disambiguation)

Masculine given names